Yamaguchi 3rd district (山口県第3区) is a single-member electoral district for the House of Representatives, the lower house of the National Diet of Japan. It is located in Mid-Western Yamaguchi and consists of the cities of Ube, Hagi City, San'yō-Onoda, Mine, Yamaguchi and Abu.

List of representatives

Election results

References 

Yamaguchi Prefecture
Districts of the House of Representatives (Japan)